Samosir, or Samosir Island, is a large volcanic island in Lake Toba, located in the north of the island of Sumatra in Indonesia. Administratively, Samosir Island is governed as six of the nine districts within Samosir Regency. The lake and island were formed after the eruption of a supervolcano some 75,000 years ago.

At , Samosir is the largest island within an island, and the fifth largest lake island in the world. Across the lake on the east from the island lies Uluan Peninsula. The island is linked to the mainland of Sumatra on its western part by a narrow isthmus connecting the town of Pangururan on Samosir and Tele on mainland Sumatra. Tele consequently offers one of the best views of Lake Toba and Samosir Island. One of the most important objects on the island is a Lutheran church, and opposite it is a huge hill.

Tourism

Samosir is a popular tourist destination due to its exotic history and the vistas it offers. The tourist resorts are concentrated in the  area. The island is the centre of the Batak culture and many of the Toba Batak traditional houses (rumah adat) remain on the island. Most of the tourist accommodations are concentrated in the small town of Tuktuk, which is located a one-hour ferry ride across the lake from the town of Parapat. The passenger ferry leaves from Tiga Raja harbor every hour between 8.30 and 19.00. For those running late there is an option to take the passenger boat from Aji bata to Tomok until 8.30 pm. A car ferry leaves the mainland from Ajibata and lands in the small town of Tomok, about a 10-minute drive from Tuktuk until 9 pm. There are also other passenger ferries and individual hotels may also have ferries available.

References

Batak
Lake islands of Asia
Islands of Sumatra
Lake Toba
Populated places in Indonesia